August 2016

References

 08
August 2016 events in the United States